The 1992 Skate Canada International was held in Victoria, British Columbia on November 5–8. Medals were awarded in the disciplines of men's singles, ladies' singles, pair skating, and ice dancing.

Results

Men

Ladies

Pairs

Ice dancing

References

External links
 Results

Skate Canada International, 1992
Skate Canada International
1992 in Canadian sports 
1992 in British Columbia